KTV may refer to:
 An Asian term for a karaoke box

Medicine
 Kt/V, a measure of haemodialysis
 Standardized Kt/V,  a measure of haemodialysis, different from Kt/V

Television

Broadcasters
 Korea TV, Korea
 Kansai Telecasting Corporation, Japan
 Kent Television, Canterbury,  UK
 Kohavision, a Kosovo TV station
 KTV Ltd., Falkland Islands
 Kurdistan TV, Iraq
 Kuwait TV

Channels
 KTV (India), Tamil-language
 Kids & Teens TV,  Florida, USA
 K-T.V. or Kids TV, South Africa

Programs
 Karaoke Television, Belize music competition

Organisations
Municipal Workers' Union, a Finnish former trade union

See also

 
 K (disambiguation)
 KT (disambiguation)
 Karaoke (disambiguation)